Vasile Teodosiu (21 December 1916 – 12 April 1989) was a Romanian long-distance runner. He competed in the marathon at the 1952 Summer Olympics.

References

External links

1916 births
1989 deaths
Athletes (track and field) at the 1952 Summer Olympics
Romanian male long-distance runners
Romanian male marathon runners
Olympic athletes of Romania